Sam Shields (21 March 1929 – 13 September 1986) was a Scottish footballer, who played as an inside forward.

References

External links
LFC History profile

1929 births
Scottish footballers
Liverpool F.C. players
1986 deaths
Cowdenbeath F.C. players
Airdrieonians F.C. (1878) players
Darlington F.C. players
Darlington Town F.C. players
Scottish Football League players
English Football League players
Association football inside forwards
People from Denny, Falkirk
Footballers from Falkirk (council area)
Dunipace F.C. players
Scottish Junior Football Association players